Blood Waters may refer to:

 Bloody Waters, a 1996 novel by Carolina Garcia-Aguilera
 "Bloody Waters", a 2018 song by Ab-Soul, Anderson Paak, and James Blake from the Black Panther soundtrack
 "Bloody Water", a 2021 song by H.E.R. and Thundercat from the album Back of My Mind

See also
 Blood and Water (disambiguation)
 Blood in the Water (disambiguation)